The men's 3000 metres steeplechase event at the 1993 Summer Universiade was held at the UB Stadium in Buffalo, United States with the final on 17 July 1993.

Medalists

Results

Heats

Final

References

Athletics at the 1993 Summer Universiade
1993